Yaoguai (妖怪 pinyin yāoguài) is a term for monsters or strange creatures. Yaogui (妖鬼 yāoguǐ, lit. "strange ghost"), yaomo (妖魔 yāomó, lit. "daemon")  or yaojing (妖精 yāojīng, often translated as "sprite" or "faerie") are loosely related terms.

Etymology
Yaoguai  (妖怪) is a compound word consisting of two Chinese characters. 妖 (yāo) is a noun meaning monster or demon. 怪 (guài) means strange or unusual when used as an adjective, and monster or unusual creature as a noun. Each word individually signifies and connotes strangeness.

Classical usages of both terms relate to preternatural phenomena and freakish occurrences where explanation fell outside the limited understanding of those observing them. These included freakish vegetation ("草妖")，eerie sounds ("鼓妖")，the unnatural onset of fog and darkness ("夜妖")，as well as a sudden loss in verbal fluency or inability to express oneself ("诗妖").   

Yāo are blamed for sudden outbreaks of confused and erratic action, or transgressive behaviour ("胡作非为"), with one saying being that "when affairs go awry, there must have been a yāo (acting)" ("事出反必有妖").

In later terminology, yāo refers to natural objects (animals, plants or rocks) which have acquired sentience (lit. spiritual awareness), the ability to assume human or near-human forms, supernatural or magical powers, as well as the ability to cultivate so as to achieve immortality or transcendence.   

In Wang Chong's 1st century text the Balanced Discussions, things such as animals, plants, and rocks are said to be endowed a human-like essence and capacities as a result of immense age ("物之老者，其精为人").  

怪 (pinyin: guai) is much broader and can refer to any kind of monstrous entity, whether inherently magical or not. It includes chimeric species of various kinds such as found in the Classic of Mountain and Seas, as well as quasi-humanoid entities such as the 魑, the 魅,  魍魉, and the 坟羊, which possess inconsistent or overlapping descriptions. 

Read together in the modern era, 妖怪 is a Chinese umbrella term that generally means "eldritch monster" and includes a wide range of entities which have a resemblance to the goblins and the unseelie faeries of other cultures. The term is usually used in Chinese mythology, folklore, and popular entertainment.

Mythology
A yao (妖, pinyin: yāo) is a supernatural creature with uncanny properties, usually dwelling in remote wildernesses or at the fringes of civilisation, and arising as the result of anomalies in the material force (qi) that pervades the natural world. In folklore, their characteristic attributes include a strange or otherworldly nature, attractiveness and beauty, and the ability to seduce or compel, and their association with ill-omens or misfortune. Typical powers ascribed to them include shapeshifting, the creation of illusions to lead astray, and mind control for the purposes of seduction or enthrallment.

In their tendencies and powers, they have some resemblance to the fairies of European lore. However, the 妖 often partake or share in the essential nature of an animal or a plant (a vixen, a snake, a butterfly, or a tree or a flower), is capable of assuming human or near-human form and of wielding supernatural powers, as well as developing other abilities due to Taoist cultivation. 

Yaoguai (妖怪) are distinct creatures from ghosts (鬼, pinyin: gui) and demons (魔, pinyin: mo). Ghosts are the spirits of the deceased, whereas demons are often described as fallen immortals and gods.    

Famous yaoguai in Chinese mythology include:

 Baigujing: literally, "skeleton spirit"
 Niumowang: literally, "bull demon king"
 Pipa Jing and Jiutou Zhiji Jing in Fengshen Yanyi

Sun Wukong (the Monkey King and protagonist) uses this term often to insult his (demonic) adversaries.

Instigation
The birth of these creatures is described as being due to human activity which disrupts the normative order. Natural phenomena (including inauspicious omens and signs, natural disasters, etc.) are correlated to human conduct in traditional Chinese thinking. Disturbances in the moral order either cause, stimulate, or evoke disturbances in the world of phenomena. The operative principle is either moralistic - the retributive punishment of Heaven, or naturalistic - the concept of stimulus-response (also known as "sympathetic resonance"). The latter is a connective principle according to which like-begets-like and the musical analogy of resonating strings is often used.  According to the classic text the Zuo Zhuan, "when people lack constancy or engage in strange or abnormal behavior, then this leads to the emergence of the yao" ("人弃常则妖兴"). 

In the literary text, Investiture of the Gods, the fox-sprite Daji is sent on a mission by the goddess Nuwa, to corrupt the last king of the Shang and to instigate the fall of his dynasty, as punishment for the latter composing a ribald poem. 

In Journey to the West, the demons seek this mostly by the abduction and consumption of a holy man (in this case, Tang Sanzang).

Not all yaojing are actually demons; some others are of quite unusual origins. In the case of Baigujing, she was a skeleton that became such a demon. Many yaojing are fox spirits, or according to the Journey to the West, pets of the deities. There are also yaoguai kings (mówáng) that command a number of lesser demon minions.

Types

Cultivated creatures  
In Chinese folklore, living creatures and inorganic substances other than humans will also gain mana, wisdom, or look completely similar to humans through years of cultivation. Such a situation has always been called "成精 (Chengjing)", "Yaoguai" and "Yaojing" are most often called such creatures, and only a few are called "仙 (Xian)"

This type of Yaoguai often appears in classic stories such as Journey to the West, Legend of the White Snake, Investiture of the Gods and Strange Stories from a Chinese Studio.

Many stories believe that only humans can cultivate. Animals and objects do not have the characteristics of humans. They should wait for the next reincarnation to become humans before they can cultivate. Therefore, the spiritual energy of non-human objects and the cultivation of human form are against the sky. "魔 (Mo)", harms mankind. Therefore, things are often oppressed after cultivation. They are either captured by Taoists or priests, or immortals, Buddhas and Bodhisattvas want them to go on the right path, and they are hardly tolerated by the right way and human beings.

In addition, there is a saying that "Dharma cannot be rectified for a thousand years, and you do not learn the wild fox Zen for a day. (千年不得正法，不學一日野狐禪)" Therefore, some gong sects clearly state that the energy and skill created by the cultivation of species and the set of practice methods they teach will also be regarded as evil. Gong, those who learn it will also be harmed by it.

Demoted gods 
In the Chinese classical novel Journey to the West, some gods were relegated to the mortal world and became Yaoguai because they violated the laws of heaven. The most representative ones are Zhu Bajie and Sha Wujing.

In addition, in the Journey to the West in the heavenly court, there are also some people who violate the laws and deviate from the mortal, but privately descend. Many of them are waiters and mounts around the gods, such as the Golden and Silver Horned Kings of the Taishang Laojun, Yellow Robe Demon, which was originally Kui Mulang, Maitreya Bodhisattva's Yellow Brows Great King, Manjushri's Azure Lion and so on.

In modern culture
In popular culture yaoguai often engage in romantic relationships with humans. These relations are usually described as subversive of the natural order, if not forbidden, and usually have detrimental effects on their human partners. The truly evil ones are usually referred to as guài (literally, "weird") or mó (literally, "demon" or "magic") in Chinese and in popular culture they are often depicted as feeding on the vital energy of their thralls. Their greatest goal is achieving immortality and deification. But monsters are not usually thought of in a religious sense. Whilst not all are evil, their appearance is generally regarded as inauspicious.

In popular culture

 The Fallout series features mutated bears identified as Yao Guai. These creatures roam many parts of post-War America, appearing in Fallout 3, the Fallout: New Vegas DLC Honest Hearts, Fallout 4, and Fallout 76. They attack both the player and various non-player characters. In Fallout 3, one of the in-game radio stations broadcasts an occasional public service announcement reminding listeners "don't feed the Yao Guai". In Fallout lore, the Yao Guai were named by descendants of Chinese internment camp prisoners.
 In the "Dark Aether" ("Zombies") storyline of the video game Call of Duty: Black Ops Cold War, the QBZ-83 assault rifle can be upgraded ("pack-a-punched"), giving the gun the name "yaoguai".
 The Taiwanese black metal band Chthonic has a drummer who wears a metal mask of a black demon mouth.
 In the downloadable content "Nightmare in North Point" of the video game Sleeping Dogs, players fight demonic creatures called "Yaoguai". 
 The American fantasy television series Once Upon a Time featured a creature called a Yaoguai in the second-season episode "The Outsider". Here, it was depicted as a large lion-like creature with a mane of fire. Maleficent transformed Prince Phillip into a Yaoguai until it was undone by Belle.
 The Yaoguai's Yaomo alias was used in AdventureQuest Worlds during its 2014 Akiba's New Year celebration on Yokai Island. It is depicted as a horned half-demon half-horse creature (with its build being similar to a centaur) with additional eyes on its chest and parts of the horse body. It was responsible for corrupting Akiba's Jingshen Forest causing the Qilin Senlin-Ma (who was the guardian of the Jingshen Forest) to enlist the player for help. The players were able to defeat the Yaomo.
 An episode of the television series Sleepy Hollow features the Yaoguai as a demon who is attracted to aggression and gunpowder from a gun.
 In the 2017 movie Wish Upon, a Yaoguai is the spirit of the music box, which grants seven wishes but kills someone close to the owner every time a wish is granted. If the seventh wish is granted, the Yaoguai will claim the soul of the owner.
 Yaojing and Yaoguai appear in popular TV series produced in China, such as Love and Redemption, Three Lives, Three Loves, Ten Miles of Peach Blossoms, and Ashes of Love. Aside from the typical fox spirits who appear in these creatures, other examples of yao* include animals, plants, and inanimate objects. All three of these series are based on Chinese e-novels in the Chinese Fantasy genre. In this genre, various types of yao* are distinguished by whether they have celestial or demonic spiritual roots, but characters with either root may be good, evil, or neutral.
 In any case, the creatures called "yao*" in the story will basically not be tolerated by human society or the world governed by gods. It is already unwritten that they are arrested, sanctioned, eradicated, or forced into society by humans or gods.
 The mobile game Gems of War features a legendary troop called Yao Guai.

See also
 Fox spirit